José María Linares Lizarazu (10 July 1808 – 23 October 1861) was a Bolivian lawyer and politician who served as the 13th president of Bolivia from 1857 to 1861.

Early life and education
He was born in Tical, Potosí, in his family's hacienda. Belonging to the noble and wealthy family of the Counts of Lords and House of Rodrigo in Navarre, Linares was related to the Spanish nobility. He was educated at the Royal and Pontifical University of San Francisco Xavier, in Sucre.

Political career

Early in his life, Linares gravitated toward the world of politics, earning a number of administrative appointments in various governments. In 1839 he was called by the new president, General José Miguel de Velasco, to take charge of the portfolio of the Interior. After this Linares was appointed Minister to Spain, where he negotiated the treaty that recognized Bolivia's independence. Serving as president of the Senate, in 1848 he was briefly called (in Velasco's temporary absence) to take provisional charge of the executive. Soon thereafter, he became leader of the so-called Partido Generador (Generator Party), which advocated democracy, civilian control of politics, and a return of the Bolivian military to its barracks. This earned Linares the mistrust of most governments of the time (which were de facto), and a few stints in exile. Nevertheless, he became the country's most important civilian and constitutionalist leader, with a growing following.

During the regime of Manuel Isidoro Belzu, Linares relentlessly plotted and conspired, aiming to bring down the caudillo.These conspiracies alongside the many rebellions under Belzu falied. They were not, however, sterile because they achieved to tire Belzu. Tired of the constant uprisings, the caudillo surrendered and left command to his son-in-law, General Jorge Córdova. Belzu wrote to him stating:I solemnly protest [he said in his message to the Congress of 1855] that no consideration will bind me to continue holding a position that is already unbearable for me, completely unbearable. Yes, a thousand times unbearable! Bolivia has become incapable of any sort of order and government. It has not seen a single stable regime. Virtue, which is the soul of the republican system and the vital principle of its conservation and progress, has been replaced by a profound demoralization that contaminates all classes. Patriotism is a vain word. In its place, a cold indifference to the common good has taken hold of everyone, and a hard selfishness that only encourages the personal growth of individuals. Loyalty has become doubtful, and the great feeling of duty, which is the religion of the good man, has been banished from hearts by the base calamity.Thus, the tired and weary Belzu left to Europe as Minister Plenipotenciary. Linares did no hesitate nor did he wait to conspire against Córdova.

President of Bolivia 
In 1857, Linares came to power at the head of a pro-civilian military coup d'état, a novelty in the country. Indeed, save for a couple of brief and minor exceptions, he can be said to be the first civilian president of Bolivia. Having toppled General Córdova, Linares legitimized his rule via the ballot box, when he was elected constitutional president by a large majority. Originally, his administration was one of the most energetic and honest that the country had seen. He introduced many reforms, and vigorously attacked the abuses that had crept into the public administration. Along the way, of course, he made many enemies, who in turn conspired against him. Rebellions and uprisings became the order of the day.

Dictator for Life and coup
Unable to remain in power by other means, in 1858 Linares did the unthinkable: he proclaimed himself "Dictator for Life", ruling by decree and by the force of arms—paradoxically, in order to restore order and eliminate all coups in the future. It was a contradiction of everything he had always purported to stand for, and predictably he became quite unpopular. In January 1861, he was overthrown as a result of a coup sponsored by his own Minister of War, José María de Achá. Exiled to Chile, Linares wrote a tantalizing pamphlet directed at the Bolivian National Congress which caused a scandal in the nation. In short, it was a reflection of his presidency and his beliefs. Linares died months after he was deposed in Valparaíso, on October 23, 1861, after his already declining health deteriorated.

References

1808 births
1861 deaths
19th-century Bolivian lawyers
19th-century Bolivian politicians
Ambassadors of Bolivia to Spain
Bolivian diplomats
Bolivian expatriates in Chile
Bolivian people of Spanish descent
Candidates in the 1855 Bolivian presidential election
Foreign ministers of Bolivia
Interior ministers of Bolivia
Leaders who took power by coup
Leaders ousted by a coup
Members of the Bolivian Chamber of Deputies from Potosí
People from José María Linares Province
Presidents of Bolivia
Presidents of the Chamber of Deputies (Bolivia)
Presidents of the Senate of Bolivia
University of Saint Francis Xavier alumni
Velasco administration cabinet members